State Route 65 (SR 65) is a  state highway in western Jackson County, in the U.S. state of Alabama. The southern terminus of the highway is at an intersection with U.S. Route 72 (US 72) at Paint Rock. The northern terminus of the highway is at the Tennessee state line, north of Francisco. North of the state line, the highway continues as Tennessee State Route 97 (SR 97).

Route description
SR 65 and Tennessee State Route 97 serve as a connecting route between US 72 in northern Alabama and US 64 in Franklin County, Tennessee. From SR 65’s southern terminus, the highway is aligned along a two-lane road with numerous curves as it travels through the mountainous regions of northeastern Alabama and southern Tennessee. North of Paint Rock, SR 65 travels through the unincorporated communities of Garth, Trenton, Hollytree, Princeton, Swaim, and Francisco, before it crosses into Tennessee. The route is notable because it travels through the entire length of the Paint Rock valley, a scenic valley in the Cumberland Plateau. This highway is also known as the Curly Putman Highway, named after the songwriter who lived in the northern portion of the valley.

Major intersections

See also

References

065
State Route 65